Arshad Junaid (born 1 January 1981) is a Sri Lankan former cricketer. He played first-class cricket for Colombo Cricket Club and Moors Sports Club. He was also a part of Sri Lanka's squad for the 1998 Under-19 Cricket World Cup.

References

External links
 

1981 births
Living people
Sri Lankan cricketers
Colombo Cricket Club cricketers
Moors Sports Club cricketers
Cricketers from Colombo
Sri Lankan Muslims